F-box only protein 32, also known as "MAFbx", for "Muscle Atrophy F-box gene", and "Atrogin-1," is a protein that in humans is encoded by the FBXO32 gene.

Function 

This gene encodes a member of the F-box protein family which is characterized by an approximately 40 amino acid motif, the F-box. The F-box proteins constitute one of the four subunits of the ubiquitin protein ligase complex called SCFs (SKP1-cullin-F-box), which function in phosphorylation-dependent ubiquitination. The F-box proteins are divided into 3 classes: Fbws containing WD-40 domains, Fbls containing leucine-rich repeats, and Fbxs containing either different protein-protein interaction modules or no recognizable motifs. The protein encoded by this gene belongs to the Fbxs class and contains an F-box domain. This protein is highly expressed during muscle atrophy, whereas mice deficient in this gene were found to be resistant to atrophy. This protein is thus a potential drug target for the treatment of muscle atrophy. Alternative splicing of this gene results in two transcript variants encoding two isoforms of different sizes.

Interactions 

FBXO32 has been shown to interact with EIF3A.

Cancer 
FBXO32 gene has been observed progressively downregulated in Human papillomavirus-positive neoplastic keratinocytes derived from uterine cervical preneoplastic lesions at different levels of malignancy. For this reason, FBXO32 is likely to be associated with tumorigenesis and may be a potential prognostic marker for uterine cervical preneoplastic lesions progression.

References

Further reading